Thomas or Tom Collier may refer to:
Thomas Collier (painter) (1840–1891), English landscape painter
Thomas Collier (Unitarian) (c. 1615–c. 1691), English General Baptist preacher and Arian polemicist
Tom Collier (musician), percussionist and vibraphonist
Tom Collier (footballer) (born 1989), Australian rules football player
Tom Collier, a character in The Animal Kingdom